Hemidactylus porbandarensis is a species of geckos found in Gujarat, India. It is usually considered conspecific with Heyden's gecko.

References

 Sharma R C 1981 Hemidactylus porbandarensis, a new geckonid lizard from Gujarat, India. Bulletin of the Zoological Survey of India 4(1) 1981: 1-2

Hemidactylus
Reptiles described in 1981

fr:Hemidactylus porbandarensis